The Cameroon women's national volleyball team represents Cameroon in international women's volleyball competitions and friendly matches. The team is one of the leading nations in women's volleyball on the African continent.

The team played in the 2014 FIVB Volleyball Women's World Championship in Italy, after securing a ticket by winning the African Pool T qualifiers with the best win–loss ratio.

Cameroon lastly qualified for the 2021 Women's African Nations Volleyball Championship where it won the gold medal.

Results

Olympic Games
 2016 — 11th place

FIVB World Championship
2006 — 21st place
2014 — 21st place
2018 — 21st place
2022 — 24th place

FIVB World Cup
2019 — 12th place

FIVB World Grand Prix
 2017 — 30th place

FIVB Volleyball Women's Challenger Cup
 2022 — 8th place

African Championship
 2003 — 3rd place
 2005 — 5th place
 2007 — 6th place
 2009 — 3rd place
 2011 — 5th place
 2013 — Runners Up
 2015 — 3rd place
 2017 — Winners 
 2019 — Winners
 2021 — Winners

All-Africa Games
 2003 — 4th place
 2007 — 2nd place
 2011 — 2nd place
 2015 — 2nd place
 2019 — 2nd place

Current squad
The following is the Cameroonian roster in the 2018 World Championship.

Head coach: Jean-René Akono

See also
Cameroon men's national volleyball team

References

External links
FIVB profile

Volleyball
National women's volleyball teams
Volleyball in Cameroon
Women's sport in Cameroon